Egil Roger Olsen (born 22 April 1942), nicknamed Drillo, is a Norwegian football manager and former footballer. He is best known as a highly successful manager of the Norway national football team. He has since been manager of the Iraq national football team, his departure from which caused considerable attention. In January 2009, he made a comeback as manager for the Norway national  team.

Club career
Olsen was a successful player with 16 caps for the national team, earning the nickname "Drillo" from his dribbling skills and technical ability. According to close friend Nils Arne Eggen, Olsen would have been awarded with more caps as a player, had it not been for Willi Kment, Norway's manager at the time, who did not approve of Olsen's long hair and generally scruffy appearance, as well as his left-wing political views. Olsen was also a formidable bandy player, while playing football.

Managerial career

He managed the Norway national team from 1990 to 1998, guiding them to World Cup final tournaments in 1994 and 1998, with Norway peaking at number two on the FIFA ranking. He worked from 2005 to 2007 as an analyst for Vålerengens IF before joining Expekt.com.

In 1995, as Norway manager Egil Olsen used one of his three votes to nominate Norway women's football star Hege Riise as the FIFA World Player of the Year. The first time a woman player had been nominated in what is seen as a men's football award.

In June 1999, the then 57-year-old Olsen made his appearance in English football, when he was named as manager of Wimbledon. He reportedly turned down an approach from Celtic to take charge of the London club, becoming the first Norwegian to manage in the Premier League. Olsen has stated that his favorite player at the club was Welsh international Ben Thatcher. He remained in charge for less than a year, and was sacked just before the club was relegated from the Premier League, having been top division members since 1986. Club captain Robbie Earle said that "Olsen just didn't know how to get the best out of us".

On 19 May 2007, Olsen rejected an offer to manage the Iraq national football team citing a busy schedule.
However, the Iraqi football president vowed not to give up on his signature and on 17 September, Olsen signed a three-year contract. In February 2008, Iraq sacked Olsen without telling him. He had tried to contact them by several means, but received the message when a new manager was installed, this action on the Iraqis part was very unexpected and their reason was said to be that they did not believe Olsen was strict enough.

On 14 January 2009, it was announced that Olsen would once again manage the Norway national football team in an interim period until a successor for Åge Hareide could be found.

In their first game under his management, they beat Germany 0–1 in a friendly away game in Düsseldorf. It is the first time Norway has won against Germany, since the 1936 Summer Olympics in Berlin.

With Olsen as manager Norway rose from No. 59 in 2009 to No. 11 in 2011 on the FIFA rankings.

On 27 September 2013, Olsen agreed to stand down as coach following the World Cup qualifying at home defeat to Switzerland.

Football philosophy
Olsen has at times been referred to as a "football professor" for his scientific approach to the game, an early user of video analysis of matches. He has collected statistical data to find out which playing styles are the most efficient. As Norway manager, he argued that as Norway didn't have the players to beat the best teams, they needed a smarter playing style than them, and one that fit Norway's skills.

He found that breakaways played an important role to making goals, and that quick counter-attacks caught opponents off guard to organize defense. Olsen believes that getting the ball down the field through the air to the attackers or flank players gave less chance for losing control. His use of a player with good heading abilities as a target man on the flank, such as Jostein Flo, was a major break with the established idea that all flank players should be small, quick and good dribblers.

He is opposed to stationary offensive players, and argues that offensive runs (also for players that do not possess the ball) should be carried out as often as possible when one's team has the ball, as multiple simultaneous runs are very difficult to defend against. He also holds the idea that breakthrough passes to the area behind the opponent's defensive line should be sought out very often, and that frequent offensive runs towards this area is important. He also coined the phrase "å være best uten ball" (roughly "to  be best at off-the-ball running", lit. "to be best without the ball") which gained some fame in Norway. It was originally said about Øyvind Leonhardsen, a player doing an exceptional number of runs during games.

Olsen is also an ardent supporter of zone defense, as opposed to man-to-man marking. He also argues that players with extreme skills (extremely fast, extremely good headers, extremely good dribblers, extremely good passers etc.), as opposed to players with only good all-round skills, are important in football.

His long-ball philosophy, use of the 4–5–1 system and his teams' often extremely successful defending was considered boring by some, but Olsen's direct attacking style would also be praised whenever it was successful - notably in Norway's wins against Brazil in 1997 and 1998.

His thoughts, together with those of Nils Arne Eggen, have had a strong impact on Norwegian football.

Personal life
Olsen was a member of the Norwegian Workers' Communist Party (known as AKP (m-l)). He is also known for his immense knowledge of geographical trivia, proven by his 2002 published factbook Drillos Verden (English: Drillo's World) published by Erling Kagge's publishing house Kagge Forlag ( Norway).

Managerial statistics

References

1942 births
Living people
Sportspeople from Fredrikstad
Kniksen Award winners
Association football wingers
Norwegian footballers
Norway international footballers
Norwegian football managers
Norway national football team managers
1994 FIFA World Cup managers
1998 FIFA World Cup managers
Premier League managers
Wimbledon F.C. managers
Vålerenga Fotball players
Sarpsborg FK players
Frigg Oslo FK players
Norwegian communists
Norwegian School of Sport Sciences alumni
Vålerenga Fotball managers
Fredrikstad FK managers
Lyn Fotball managers
Aalesunds FK managers
Iraq national football team managers
Norwegian expatriate football managers
Expatriate football managers in England
Norwegian expatriate sportspeople in England
Frigg Oslo FK managers